Barbara Poppe (born 1958) was the executive director of the United States Interagency Council on Homelessness (USICH) from 2009 to 2014. Prior to her appointment at USICH, she spent over 20 years working on homelessness with housing-related organizations in Ohio. After her role at the USCIH, she founded a consulting business, Barbara Poppe & Associates LLC.

Education
Poppe completed her undergraduate degree at William Woods University in Fulton, Missouri.  She received a Bachelor of Science in chemistry. She continued her education at the University of Cincinnati, first as a medical student and then as a student of epidemiology in the College of Medicine's Department of Environmental Health.  She received her Master of Science in epidemiology from the University of Cincinnati in 1987.

Career
Poppe began her work in the homeless sector through volunteering in Cincinnati. After completing her Master's in Epidemiology, Poppe worked as a Field Instructor for the University of Cincinnati in the Department of Environmental Health from July 1988 to June 1990. She was executive director of Friends of the Homeless, Inc., in Columbus, Ohio, from June 1990 to October 1995.

Community Shelter Board, Columbus, Ohio
Poppe served as executive director of the Community Shelter Board (CSB), a non-profit organization in Columbus, Ohio, from October 1995 to November 2009.

In 2004 she received the Buddy Gray Award for homeless activism from the National Coalition for the Homeless.

U.S. Interagency Council on Homelessness
Poppe was appointed to serve as executive director of the United States Interagency Council on Homelessness in October 2009.

She announced that she was leaving USICH February 4, 2014, and on February 18, 2014, it was announced that Laura Zeilinger would replace her.

References

1958 births
Living people
Homelessness activists
William Woods University alumni
University of Cincinnati alumni